Arhynchobdellida, the proboscisless leeches, are  a monophyletic order of leeches. They are defined by the lack of the protrusible proboscis that defines their sister taxon, the Rhynchobdellida. Arhynchobdellida is a diverse order, comprimising both aquatic and terrestrial, besides sanguivorous and predatory, leeches. The order is divided into two suborders, Erpobdelliformes and Hirudiniformes (sometimes also called the Pharyngobdelliformes and Gnathobdelliformes, respectively).

Taxonomy 
Historically, the Arhynchobdellida were split into two orders, the Gnathobdellida and the Pharyngobdellida. The Gnathobdellida were jawed and carnivorous of parasitic while the Pharyngobdellida were jawless and carnivorous. Current taxonomy accepts the order Arhynchobdellida and divides into two suborders. There are 215 species of Arhynchobdellid leech, in 47 genera and 13 families. The placement of Americobdellidae is uncertain; it has rudimentary jaws and is terrestrial.

Erpobdelliformes 
Erpobdelliformes are jawless predators of aquatic invertebrates of varying sizes, including insect larvae, mollusks, and other annelids. Unlike other leeches, they do not penetrate the skin of hosts; and are not at all parasitic. The pharynx is spirally twisted and very large to allow for large prey; it can constitute up to one third of the leech's body length.

Hirudiniformes 
Hirudiniformes are a diverse suborder defined by the presence of toothed jaws.

Cladogram

References

Leeches